The National Institute of Standards and Technology succeeded the National Bureau of Standards in 1988. Following is a list of the directors of both agencies.

References

Executive branch of the government of the United States
United States Department of Commerce officials